was, depending on the source, the second or third highest-scoring flying ace of the Imperial Japanese Army Air Force in World War II, with 39 victories (51 claimed). Strangely enough there are 53 claimed victories to be found in his autobiography Soku no Kawa (see below), where his first triple kill (nos. 10-12) was mis-counted as just one (next kill was noted as no. 11).

Imperial Japanese Army Air Force career
Born into a farming family in the Kagawa Prefecture, he graduated high school to take the entrance examination for the Juvenile Flying Soldier School and entered the Tokyo Army Aviation School in April 1938, graduating in March 1941 in the 6th Juvenile Soldier Course and receiving a promotion to corporal in October. He was assigned to the 3rd Company of the 50th Air Squadron, stationed on Formosa in 1941.

With the outbreak of the Pacific War, he fought in the conquest of the Philippines, where he claimed his first victory, a Curtiss P-40, on December 22, 1941. On February 9, 1942, he shot down two more.

Soon after, his unit returned to Japan to exchange their Nakajima Ki-27 "Nates" for more advanced Ki-43 "Hayabusa" (allied code name "Oscar"). The 50th Air Squadron was then sent to Burma in June 1942. He was promoted to sergeant in December. On 24 January 1943, he shot down his first heavily armed B-24 bomber. He claimed to have shot down three B-24s and one P-38 fighter escort in a single engagement on 8 October 1943, but this has been disputed. The third B-24 claimed was reported rammed by him causing great damage to his aircraft in which he crash landed on the shoreline to be rescued three days later. In recognition of this achievement he was awarded an individual citation - at that time unprecedented for a pilot who was still alive.

In 1944, he was reassigned to Japan to be a flight instructor at the Akeno Army Flying School. He flew in the defense of the home islands. In December 1944, he was promoted to sergeant major and returned to action over the Philippines, where he claimed at least four F6F Hellcats shot down flying the Ki-84 "Hayate". Anabuki scored his last victory over Japan, a B-29.

Postwar
When the Japan Self-Defense Forces were formed in the early 1950s, he enlisted and flew a helicopter for many years before retiring. After the war in 1950, he enlisted in the National Police Reserve. Via the NPR, he served as a captain flying Northeast Ground Self-Defense Force helicopters. He retired as a lieutenant colonel in 1971, subsequently joining Japan Airlines and retiring in 1984.

Many of Anabuki's victory claims during the Burma Campaign have been contested by comparing them to Allied records of lost aircraft on particular occasions. In several cases, there were no records of Allied planes even operating in the area where the claims were made.

References

Notes

Bibliography

 Anabuki, Satoru. Soku no Kawa (A Great River in the Blue Sky/Pale Blue River). Tokyo, Japan: Kojinsha Publishers, 1985. . (2nd edition 2000).
 Bueschel, Richard M. Nakajima Ki-43 Hayabusa I-III in Japanese Army Air Force RTAF-CAF-IPSF Service. Reading, Berkshire, UK: Osprey Publications, 1970. .
 Bueschel, Richard M. Nakajima Ki-43 Hayabusa in Japanese Army Air Force RTAF-CAF-IPSF Service. Atglen, PA: Schiffer Books, 1995. .
 Coox, Alvin D. "The Rise and Fall of the Imperial Japanese Air Forces". Air Power History 27 June, 1980. pages 74–94.
 Harvey, A.D. "Army Air Force and Navy Air Force: Japanese Aviation and the Opening Phase of the War in the Far East". War in History 6 1999. pages 147–173.
 Hata, Ikuhiko with Yasuho Izawa and Christopher Shores. Japanese Army Air Force Fighter Units and Their Aces, 1931-1945. London: Grub Street, 2002. .
 Sakaida, Henry. Japanese Army Air Force Aces, 1937-45. Botley, Oxfordshire, UK: Osprey Publishing, 1997. .
 Scott, Peter. Emblems of the Rising Sun: Imperial Japanese Army Air Force Unit Markings. Aldershot, Hertfordshire, UK: Hikoki, 1999. .
 Stanaway, John. Nakajima Ki.43 "Hayabusa" - Allied Code Name "Oscar". Bennington, VT: Merriam Press, 2003. .
 Shores, Christopher. Air War for Burma: The Allied Air Forces Fight Back in South-East Asia 1942-1945 (The Bloody Shambles Series, Vol. 3). London, UK: Grub Street Publishing, 2005. .

External links
 Anabuki Satoru's deed over Rangoon
 Imperial Japanese Army Air Force Aces
 Satoshi Anabuki

Japanese World War II flying aces
1921 births
2005 deaths
Japan Ground Self-Defense Force personnel